Melbourne Municipal Airport , also known as John E. Miller Field, is a city-owned, public-use airport located three nautical miles (6 km) east of the central business district of Melbourne, a city in Izard County, Arkansas, United States. It is included in the National Plan of Integrated Airport Systems for 2011–2015, which categorized it as a general aviation facility.

Facilities and aircraft
Melbourne Municipal - John E. Miller Field covers an area of 130 acres (53 ha) at an elevation of 735 feet (224 m) above mean sea level. It has one runway designated 3/21 with an asphalt surface measuring 4,002 by 75 feet (1,220 x 23 m).

For the 12-month period ending July 31, 2011, the airport had 7,520 aircraft operations, an average of 20 per day: 99.7% general aviation and 0.3% military. At that time there were 11 aircraft based at this airport: 91% single-engine and 9% multi-engine.

References

External links
Melbourne – John E. Miller Field (42A) at Arkansas Department of Aeronautics
Aerial image as of February 2001 from USGS The National Map

Airports in Arkansas
Buildings and structures in Izard County, Arkansas
Transportation in Izard County, Arkansas